The LIX Legislature of the Congress of Sonora met from September 2009 to September 2012. All members of the Congress were elected in the 2009 Sonora state election.

The LIX Legislature consists of 14 deputies from the National Action Party (PAN), 12 deputies from the Institutional Revolutionary Party (PRI), 2 deputies from the Party of the Democratic Revolution (PRD), 2 deputies form the Ecologist Green Party of Mexico (PVEM) and 3 deputy form the New Alliance Party.

Composition

By relative majority

Plurinominal Deputies

References

Congress of Sonora